Alexis Coe is an American presidential historian, podcast host, and author of Alice + Freda Forever: A Murder in Memphis (2014) and the New York Times best-selling You Never Forget Your First: A Biography of George Washington (2020). In December 2020, she launched the newsletter Study Marry Kill.

Career 
Coe was an oral historian for the Brooklyn Historical Society while in graduate school. Upon graduation, she became a research curator in the New York Public Library’s exhibitions department where she co-curated "Find the Past, Know the Future," the most popular exhibition in the Library's history.

After leaving the NYPL in 2012, Coe's work as a public historian was immediately met with popular success. She contributed to The Atlantic, Slate, The New Yorker, and The New York Times Magazine and Opinion section, among other publications.

Coe published Alice + Freda Forever: A Murder in Memphis in 2014 to critical success. She was praised by The New Yorker for telling the story of Alice Mitchell and Freda Ward "with the color and liveliness of a novel." Coe began co-hosting the podcast Presidents Are People Too! in 2016 and No Man's Land in 2018, the latter of which won, among other honors, a Webby. In 2022, she announced Duncan & Coe, a forthcoming podcast on history books she will cohost with Mike Duncan, author of the bestselling biography, Lafayette.

In 2020, Coe published You Never Forget Your First: A Biography of George Washington, making her the first female biographer to publish a biography of Washington in over a century. The book became a New York Times best-seller in February 2020 and was widely praised as genre-breaking. Her twenty-city tour was cut short by the coronavirus pandemic.

Coe produced and starred in The History Channel's Washington series with Doris Kearns Goodwin. In December 2020, she launched the newsletter "Study Marry Kill" with the help of a grant provided by Substack.

Coe has given keynote lectures at West Point, the National Constitution Center, the Library of Congress, Georgetown University, and many others. She is often in conversation with leading intellectuals and authors, including Jamelle Bouie, Noah Feldman, Jennifer Egan, and Julian Zelizer. She has consulted for private companies and nonprofits, including The Wing, Casper, and the ACLU.

Personal life 
In 2017, she was married by Ruth Bader Ginsburg to a New Yorker editor. In 2022, she filed for divorce. Coe works in New York City and lives in Rhinebeck, New York, with her young daughter.

Bibliography 

 Coe, Alexis (2014). Alice + Freda Forever: A Murder in Memphis. Pulp/Zest. ISBN 9781936976607. OCLC 1051071944.
 Coe, Alexis (2021). You Never Forget Your First: A Biography of George Washington. Penguin Random House. ISBN 9780735224117. OCLC 1247158274.

References 

1982 births
Living people
American women historians
21st-century American historians
21st-century American women writers